The Bonnot Gang (La Bande à Bonnot) was a French criminal anarchist group that operated in France and Belgium during the late Belle Époque, from 1911 to 1912. Composed of individuals who identified with the emerging illegalist milieu, the gang used cutting-edge technology (including automobiles and repeating rifles) not yet available to the French police.

Originally referred to by the press as simply "The Auto Bandits" as its members carried out the first motorized robberies and bank raids in world history, the gang was dubbed "The Bonnot Gang" after Jules Bonnot gave an interview at the office of Le Petit Parisien, a popular daily paper. Bonnot's perceived prominence within the group was later reinforced by his high-profile death during a shootout with French police in Choisy-le-Roi.

Members 

Principal gang members included:

 Jules Bonnot
 Octave Garnier
 Raymond Callemin 
 Anna Dondon
 Marie Vuillemin
 André Soudy
  Édouard Carouy 
 Jeanne Belardi
 Jean De Boe
 Étienne Monier
 Eugène Dieudonné

Crime spree 

The first robbery by Bonnot's Gang was on December 21, 1911 at the AB Branch of Société Générale Bank, located at 148 rue Ordener in the 18th Arrondissement of Paris. They shot a collection clerk in the neck and lung (yet he survived) and snatched his cash bags.

On March 25, 1912, the gang stole a de Dion-Bouton automobile in the Forest of Sénart south of Paris by shooting the driver through the heart. They drove into Chantilly north of Paris where they robbed the local branch of Société Générale Bank fatally shooting two bank cashiers and severely wounding a bookkeeper.

Sûreté Chief Xavier Guichard took the matter personally. Even politicians became concerned, increasing police funding by 800,000 francs. Banks began to prepare for forthcoming robberies and many cashiers armed themselves. The Société Générale promised a reward of 100,000 francs for information that would lead to arrests.

See more 

 La Bande à Bonnot, 1968 film
 Les Brigades du Tigre
 Les Vampires, 1915–16 serial

References

Further reading
 Cacucci, Pino. (2006) Without a Glimmer of Remorse. ChristieBooks. .
 Imrie, Doug. (1994) The Illegalists. Anarchy: A Journal of Desire Armed.
 
 Parry, Richard. (1987) The Bonnot Gang. Rebel Press. .

Film 
 Bandits en automobile, 1912 docudrama by Victorin-Hippolyte Jasset 
 Episode of Val-de-Marne TV "Histories of the Marne" dedicated to the Bonnot Gang

External links 

 The Bonnot Gang: The story of the French Illegalists, by Richard Parry, hosted by libcom.org.

Illegalists
Defunct anarchist organizations in France
Defunct anarchist militant groups
French bank robbers
Motor vehicle theft
Gangs in France
1911 in France
1912 in France
Left-wing militant groups in France
Belle Époque